Camp Ethan Allen Training Site is a Vermont National Guard installation located in Jericho, Vermont. It is the location of the Army Mountain Warfare School and the 86th Infantry Brigade Combat Team. It was looked at as a future location for a proposed missile battery until 2013.

The installation is named for Revolutionary War patriot Ethan Allen.

References

External links

Installations of the United States Army National Guard
Buildings and structures in Jericho, Vermont
Historic American Engineering Record in Vermont
Military installations in Vermont
National Guard (United States)
United States Army posts